The 1924 Tuskegee Golden Tigers football team was an American football team that represented Tuskegee University as a member of the Southern Intercollegiate Athletic Conference (SIAC) during the 1924 college football season. In its second season under head coach Cleveland Abbott, Tuskegee compiled a 9–0–1 record, won the SIAC championship, shut out six of ten opponents, and outscored all opponents by a total of 301 to 25. The team was recognized as the black college national champion.

Schedule

References

Tuskegee
Tuskegee Golden Tigers football seasons
Black college football national champions
Tuskegee Golden Tigers football
College football undefeated seasons